Thiruthuraipoondi Radhakrishnan Sivasankaran (T. R. Pappa) (3 July 1922 – 15 October 2004) was an Indian music director of Tamil, Telugu and Sinhalese films. He was born in 1923 at Thiruthuraipoondi, Madras Presidency, British India.

Early life 
Papa's real name is Sivasankaran, who is from a lineage of musical family. He started training on the violin from early childhood. His father had inability to pay tuition fees his education was stopped in middle. He was trained by Siva Vadivelu Pillai who joined in National movie tone cinema company, as fiddle player to some movies Seemanthini 1936 Parvathi Kalyanam 1936 and this life of carrying instruments ended in 1938.

After he joined as a helper to S.G. Kasi Iyer, elder brother of great Kittappa. In 1941 most of the citizens was flying to other towns due to fear of Japanese Bombing Jupiter Pictures was shifted to Coimbatore, M.S.Viswanathan went with S.V.Venkatraman who is famous music director on those days. Kalki's daughter Ananthi, Sadasivam's daughter Radha were dancers, jointly made dance Programmes, M.S.Viswanathan as Playback Singer along with Papa Violin.

Career 
Papa started playing the violin in Manonmani Modern Theatres and Kannagi, Kubera Kusela, and Maha Maya Jupiter Pictures. In the late 40s, Papa and T. K. Ramamoorthy were the highest paid violinists for the movies and were always in demand.

Papa became music director for Malayalam film Athmasanthi (1952). The chance was given to him by Joseph Thaliyath Jr of Citadel Film Corporation. This film is dubbed in Tamil under the same title.

Then onwards, Papa went on to compose for many of Citadel films such as  Mallika, Vijayapuri Veeran, Vilakketriyaval, Iravum Pagalum and Kadhal Paduthum Paadu.

Papa also composed music for many Sinhalese films. The song Siriyame Sara, sung by H. R. Jothipala is one of the popular hits in Sinhalese.

He worked with singers like T. M. Soundararajan, A. M. Rajah, Seerkazhi Govindarajan, Thiruchi Loganathan, C. S. Jayaraman, S. C. Krishnan, A. L. Raghavan, M. L. Vasanthakumari, P. Leela, Jikki, T. V. Rathnam, A. P. Komala, P.B.Srinivos, K. Jamuna Rani, P. Suseela, A. G. Rathnamala, T. S. Bagavathi, Soolamangalam Rajalakshmi, A. Nithyakala, S. Janaki, L. R. Eswari, S. P. Balasubrahmaniam, B. S. Sasirekha, S. P. Sailaja.

The singing actors K. R. Ramasamy, T. R. Rajakumari, P. Bhanumathi, N. S. Krishnan, T. A. Madhuram and J. P. Chandrababu also sang memorable songs under his compositions.

As a Nilaya Vidwan of AIR from 1946, Papa accompanied the violin for many great classical vocalists. He composed music for many wonderful devotional albums with Seerkazhi Govindarajan where the song Chinnanjiru Penn Pole dedicated to the Goddess Abirami is notable. Papa scored music for the album Abirami Andhaadhi. Papa has served as the Principal of Madras Music College.

T. R. Ramanna and Papa were classmates in Thanjavur. T. R. Ramanna was in the midst of the making of Arunagirinathar when the music director G. Ramanathan fell ill. Papa was called upon to complete the rest of the songs. T. R. Ramana again engaged Papa for his movies in the early 1970s.

Tamil Isai Sangam conferred the title Isai Perarignar (Great Scholar of Music) on him.

Works 
Some of the notable music compositions:
Enna Enna Inbame for Anbu by A. M. Rajah and Jikki
Samarasam Ulaavum Idame for Rambaiyin Kaadhal by Seerkazhi Govindarajan
Bagavane Mounam Eno for Rambaiyin Kaadhal by Seerkazhi Govindarajan
Varuven Naan Unadhu for Mallika by A. M. Rajah and P. Suseela
Chinnanjiru Vayathu Mudhal for Thaai Magalukku Kattiya Thaali by T. M. Soundararajan and Jikki
Yaar Solluvaar Nilave for Kuravanji by C. S. Jayaraman
 Sirikkindraal Indru Sirikkindraal for Nallavan Vazhvan by Sirkazhi Govindarajan and P. Suseela
Ullam Thedaathe Endru Solluthe for Ethaiyum Thangum Idhayam by K. R. Ramasamy and S. Janaki
Unakkum Enakkum Veguthooram Illai for Ethaiyum Thangum Idhayam by Soolamangalam Rajalakshmi
Muththaitharu Paththithala for Arunagirinathar by T. M. Soundararajan
Onnume puriyale ulagathile for Kumara Raja by J. P. Chandrababu
Ullathin Kadhavugal Kanngalada for Iravum Pagalum by T. M. Soundararajan
Muththama Asai Muththama for Vilakketriyaval by P. Suseela
Asai Ponggum Azhagu Roobam for Asai by A. M. Rajah and Jikki
Soodi Koduthaval Naan Thozhi for Teacheramma by P. Suseela
Thalai Vaari poochoodi Unnai for Rangoon Radha by P. Bhanumathi
Iraivan Endroru Kavignan for Yen by S. P. Balasubrahmaniam
Ullathile Uram Vendumada for Vijayapuri Veeran by A. M. Rajah
Vennila Nerathile Venugaanam for Avasara Kalyanam by P. Suseela

Filmography

References

External links 
Myriad Music Composers of the Last Century in My Movie Minutes

Tamil film score composers
Tamil musicians
1922 births
2004 deaths
People from Tiruvarur district
20th-century Indian composers
Indian male film score composers
20th-century male musicians